William Mortlock may refer to:

 Will Mortlock (1832–1884), English professional cricketer — active 1851 to 1870
 William Ranson Mortlock (1821–1884), pioneer grazier and politician in colonial South Australia
 William Tennant Mortlock (1858–1913), grazier and politician in South Australia (grandson of William Ranson Mortlock)